Stephen Pritko (December 21, 1920 – June 6, 2015) was an American football end who played eight seasons in the National Football League (NFL). He was born in Northampton, Pennsylvania.

Early life and education
Pritco was born December 21, 1920 in Northampton, Pennsylvania. He attended Northampton Area High School and then Villanova.

NFL career
He entered the National Football League in 1943. During his NFL career, he played for the New York Giants in 1943, the Cleveland and Los Angeles Rams from 1944 through 1947, the Boston Yanks in 1949, and the Green Bay Packers from 1949 until 1950.

Death
Pritko died June 6, 2015 in Gardena, California at age 94.

References

External links

1920 births
2015 deaths
Northampton Area High School alumni
American football ends
Boston Yanks players
Cleveland Rams players
Green Bay Packers players
Los Angeles Rams players
New York Bulldogs players
New York Giants players
Villanova Wildcats football players
Sportspeople from Northampton County, Pennsylvania
Players of American football from Pennsylvania